Otero's 66 Service, at 100 Main St. in Los Lunas, New Mexico, was built in 1923.  It was listed on the National Register of Historic Places in 2003.

Located on historic United States Route 66, it is a former Phillips Service Station and has been operated as Sam's Tire and Lube.

References

National Register of Historic Places in Valencia County, New Mexico
U.S. Route 66
Transportation buildings and structures on the National Register of Historic Places in New Mexico
Commercial buildings in New Mexico
Commercial buildings completed in 1923